The Lariat Loop National Scenic and Historic Byway is a National Scenic Byway and a Colorado Scenic and Historic Byway located in Jefferson County, Colorado, USA. The byway is a  loop in the Front Range foothills west of Denver through Golden, Lookout Mountain Park, Genesee Park, Evergreen, Morrison, Red Rocks Park, and Dinosaur Ridge. The Lariat Loop connects to the Mount Evans Scenic Byway at Bergen Park.

Route

The byway includes portions of State Highway 93 between Golden and Morrison, State Highway 74 from Morrison to Evergreen via Bear Creek Canyon, and the same road north to Interstate 70, which bisects the loop. The Lariat Trail connects Golden with the top of Lookout Mountain and Lookout Mountain Road completes the loop back to Interstate 70. This route formed the foundation for the surrounding  area’s designation as a Colorado Heritage Area in 2000; the Byway was so designated by the Colorado Dept. of Transportation and Governor Owens in April 2002. The Lariat Loop connects to the Mount Evans Scenic Byway via Squaw Pass Road.

The Lariat Loop Byway blends natural, cultural, and historic attributes in a route that has been promoted as a tourist destination since 1914 and can be enjoyed in a half-day’s drive from Denver. Along the route are dozens of historic sites, scenic parks, and other attractions (see list below), many of which are listed on the National Register of Historic Places. Although the Lariat Loop is not listed, it comprises two registered routes, the Bear Creek Canyon Scenic Mountain Drive and the Lariat Trail Scenic Mountain Drive.

The Lariat Loop encompasses parts of Denver’s original “circle drives,” within the unique Denver Mountain Parks system designed by F.L. Olmsted, Jr, in 1914. The diverse geography of the foothills setting offers dense forests, mountain vistas, winding roads, rocky outcrops and ridges, and historic “beauty spots.” Many of these scenic areas have become county or city parks and are accessible to the public.

All roads along the Lariat Loop Byway are accessible via passenger vehicle, with convenient services, year-round. Open Space and Mountain Parks are protected areas and all wildlife and plants are protected.

Attractions
Golden, Colorado
Windy Saddle Park
Lookout Mountain Park
Buffalo Bill Museum and Grave
Lookout Mountain Preserve and Nature Center
Genesee, Colorado
Genesee Park
Chief Hosa Lodge
El Rancho, Colorado
Fillius Park
Bergen Park, Colorado
Elk Meadow Park
Evergreen, Colorado
Dedisse Park
Evergreen Lake
Hiwan Homestead Museum
Kittredge, Colorado
O'Fallon Park
Corwina Park
Lair O'the Bear Park
Little Park
Idledale, Colorado
Morrison, Colorado
Morrison Historic District
Morrison Natural History Museum
Red Rocks Park
Red Rocks Amphitheatre
Red Rocks Park and Mount Morrison Civilian Conservation Corps Camp, a National Historic Landmark
Dinosaur Ridge
Matthews/Winters Park
Mount Vernon, Colorado
Apex Park
Golden, Colorado
Astor House Museum
Clear Creek History Park
Colorado Railroad Museum
Colorado School of Mines
Mines Museum of Earth Science
Coors Brewery (world's largest)
Foothills Art Center
Golden Pioneer Museum
Golden Visitors Center
National Renewable Energy Laboratory (NREL)
Rocky Mountain Quilt Museum

Major intersections

Gallery

See also

History Colorado
List of scenic byways in Colorado
Scenic byways in the United States

Notes

References

External links

America's Byways
Bureau of Land Management Back Country Byways
Colorado Department of Transportation
Colorado Scenic & Historic Byways Commission
Colorado Scenic & Historic Byways
Colorado Travel Map
Colorado Tourism Office
History Colorado

Colorado Scenic and Historic Byways
National Scenic Byways in Colorado
National Scenic Byways
Transportation in Colorado
Transportation in Jefferson County, Colorado
Tourist attractions in Colorado
Tourist attractions in Jefferson County, Colorado
Interstate 70
U.S. Route 6
U.S. Route 40